Wang Jiayu (Chinese: 王佳玉; Pinyin: Wáng Jiāyù; born 28 September 1990 in Shanghai) is a Chinese football player who currently plays for Chinese Super League side Shanghai SIPG as a midfielder.

Club career
Born in Shanghai, Wang joined Genbao Football Academy in 2000 and was promoted to Shanghai East Asia squad in 2006 for the China League Two campaign. He played as a regular starter and became the captain within the team as Shanghai East Asia won promotion to the second tier in the 2007 season. 

On 10 December 2010, Wang transferred to Chinese Super League side Nanchang Hengyuan along with his teammate Jiang Zhipeng for a total fee of ¥6 million. He made 27 league appearances in the 2011 season, which secured Nanchang's stay in the top flight for the next season. Wang followed the club to move to Shanghai in 2012. On 27 October 2012, he scored his first Super League goal in a 1–1 home draw against Shandong Luneng Taishan.

On 29 December 2013, Wang returned to Shanghai East Asia. He failed to establish himself within the team after Sven-Göran Eriksson became the manager of the club in the 2015 season. On 22 June 2015, Wang was loaned to fellow Super League side Hangzhou Greentown for half season. Wang was degraded to Shanghai SIPG's reserve squad in the summer of 2016. Wang joined Segunda División B side Lorca FC, which owned by Xu Genbao, as an unregister player in March 2017. Wang made a trail with Réunion Premier League side AS Excelsior at the recommendation of former Shanghai East Asia manager Claude Lowitz in May 2017. However, he failed to pass the trial in June 2017.

Career statistics

Honours
Shanghai East Asia
China League Two: 2007

References

1990 births
Living people
Chinese footballers
Footballers from Shanghai
Shanghai Shenxin F.C. players
Shanghai Port F.C. players
Zhejiang Professional F.C. players
Chinese Super League players
China League One players
Association football midfielders